Lonely is the first Korean language single album by the South Korean band N.Flying. It was released by FNC Entertainment on 22 October 2015.

Background 
On October 14, 2015, it was announced that N.Flying would make their comeback with a single album on October 22. It was their first comeback five months after the group's debut. Three songs were recorded for the single album, including title track "Lonely". J.don was involved in writing the lyrics for all three songs. The group held a showcase commemorating the release of their single album on October 21.

On October 22, 2015, the group released the single album along with the music video of the title track, "Lonely".

Track listing

References 

2015 singles
FNC Entertainment singles